The Minister in the Prime Minister's Department is a member of Cabinet of Malaysia who administers a portfolio through the Prime Minister's Department.

List of Ministers in the Prime Minister's Department
The following individuals have been appointed as Minister in the Prime Minister's Department, or any of its precedent titles:

Political Party:

References

Prime Minister's Department (Malaysia)
Lists of government ministers of Malaysia
Malaysia
Malaysia